The Borchgrevink Coast is that portion of the coast of Victoria Land between Cape Adare and Cape Washington. The name was recommended by New Zealand Antarctic Place-Names Committee in 1961 after Carsten Borchgrevink, a member of Henrik Johan Bull's expedition to this area, 1894–95, and leader of the British Antarctic Expedition, 1898–1900, the first to winter on the continent, at Cape Adare.

Landmarks
Agate Peak is a peak situated in the southeast area of the Intention Nunataks, at the southwest margin of Evans Neve within the Borchgrevink Coast. So named by the New Zealand Antarctic Place-Names Committee because agate and other semi-precious stones were found here by the Southern Party of New Zealand Geological Survey Antarctic Expedition, 1966–67.

See also
Borchgrevink Canyon

References

 

 
Coasts of Victoria Land
Coasts of the Ross Dependency